Precordillera is a Spanish geographical term for hills and mountains lying before a greater range, foothills. The term is derived from cordillera (mountain range)—literally "pre-mountain range"—and applied usually to the Andes.

Some places usually called precordillera are:
Andean mountains east of the main ranges of Andes in Argentina. It is separated from the much higher Frontal Cordillera to the west by Uspallata Valley in Argentina. Precordillera mountains reach around 3,000 m a.s.l. in Sierras de Villavicencio.
Used all over Chile from north to south as a morphological unit lying just between the Andes and the Intermediate Depression.

See also
 Geological history of the precordillera terrane

References

Hills
Mountains
Geography of Argentina
Geography of Chile
Mountain geomorphology
Geography terminology